The 3rd Annual Grammy Awards were held on April 13, 1961, at Los Angeles and New York. They recognized musical accomplishments by the performers for the year 1960. Ray Charles won four awards and Bob Newhart and Henry Mancini each won three awards.

Award winners
Record of the Year
Percy Faith for "Theme from A Summer Place"
Album of the Year
Bob Newhart for The Button-Down Mind of Bob Newhart
Song of the Year
Ernest Gold for "Theme of Exodus"
Best New Artist
Bob Newhart

Children's
Best Album Created for Children
Ross Bagdasarian Sr. for Let's All Sing With the Chipmunks performed by Ross Bagdasarian Sr. as "David Seville and the Chipmunks"

Classical
Best Classical Performance - Orchestra
Fritz Reiner (conductor) & the Chicago Symphony Orchestra for Bartók: Music for Strings, Percussion and Celesta
Best Classical Performance - Vocal Soloist
Leontyne Price for A Program of Song - Leontyne Price Recital
Best Classical Opera Production
Erich Leinsdorf (conductor), Birgit Nilsson, Giorgio Tozzi, Jussi Björling, Renata Tebaldi & the Rome Opera Orchestra for Puccini: Turandot
Best Classical Performance - Choral (including oratorio)
Thomas Beecham (conductor) & the Royal Philharmonic Orchestra & Chorus for Handel: Messiah
Best Classical Performance - Concerto or Instrumental Soloist
Erich Leinsdorf (conductor), Sviatoslav Richter & the Chicago Symphony Orchestra for Brahms: Piano Concerto No. 2 in B Flat
Best Classical Performance - Instrumental Soloist or Duo (other than with orchestral accompaniment)
Laurindo Almeida for The Spanish Guitars of Laurindo Almeida
Best Classical Performance - Vocal or Instrumental - Chamber Music
Laurindo Almeida for Conversations With the Guitar
Best Contemporary Classical Composition
Aaron Copland (composer & conductor) & the Boston Symphony Orchestra for Orchestral Suite from The Tender Land Suite

Comedy
Best Comedy Performance - Spoken Word
Bob Newhart for The Button-Down Mind Strikes Back!
 Best Comedy Performance - Musical
Jo Stafford & Paul Weston for Jonathan and Darlene Edwards in Paris performed by Jo Stafford & Paul Weston and as "Jonathan & Darlene Edwards"

Composing and arranging
Best Sound Track Album or Recording of Music Score from Motion Picture or Television
Ernest Gold (composer) for Exodus
Best Arrangement
Henry Mancini (arranger & artist) for Mr. Lucky

Country
Best Country & Western Performance
Marty Robbins for "El Paso"

Folk
Best Performance - Folk
Harry Belafonte for "Swing Dat Hammer"

Jazz
Best Jazz Performance Solo or Small Group
André Previn for West Side Story
Best Jazz Performance Large Group
Henry Mancini for Blues and the Beat
Best Jazz Composition of More Than Five Minutes Duration
Gil Evans & Miles Davis for Sketches of Spain

Musical show
 Best Show Album (Original Cast)
Oscar Hammerstein II, Richard Rodgers (composers), Mary Martin & the original cast for The Sound of Music
Best Sound Track Album or Recording of Original Cast From a Motion Picture or Television
Cole Porter (composer), Frank Sinatra & the original cast for Can Can

Packaging and notes
Best Album Cover
Marvin Schwartz (art director) for Latin a la Lee performed by Peggy Lee

Pop
Best Vocal Performance Single Record or Track, Female
Ella Fitzgerald for "Mack the Knife"
Best Vocal Performance Album, Female
Ella Fitzgerald for Mack the Knife - Ella in Berlin
Best Vocal Performance Single Record or Track, Male
Ray Charles for "Georgia on My Mind"
Best Vocal Performance Album, Male
Ray Charles for The Genius of Ray Charles
Best Performance by a Vocal Group (2 to 6)
Eydie Gormé & Steve Lawrence for "We Got Us"
Best Performance by a Chorus (7 or More Persons)
Norman Luboff for Songs of the Cowboy performed by the Norman Luboff Choir
Best Performance by a Band for Dancing
Count Basie for Dance Along with Basie
Best Performance by an Orchestra
Henry Mancini for Mr. Lucky
Best Performance by a Pop Single Artist
Ray Charles for "Georgia on My Mind"

Production and engineering
Best Engineering Contribution - Popular Recording
Luis P. Valentin (engineer) for Ella Fitzgerald Sings the George and Ira Gershwin Songbook performed by Ella Fitzgerald
Best Engineering Contribution - Classical Recording
Hugh Davies (engineer) & Laurindo Almeida for The Spanish Guitars of Laurindo Almeida
Best Engineering Contribution - Novelty Recording
John Kraus (engineer) for "The Old Payola Roll Blues" performed by Stan Freberg

R&B
Best Rhythm & Blues Performance
Ray Charles for "Let the Good Times Roll"

Spoken
Best Performance - Documentary or Spoken Word (other than comedy)
Robert Bialek (producer) for FDR Speaks

References

General

 003
1961 in Los Angeles
1961 in New York City
1961 music awards
Events in Los Angeles
Events in New York City
1961 in American music
April 1961 events in the United States